Njabulo Blom (born 11 December 1999) is a South African professional soccer player who plays as a central midfielder or right back for Major League Soccer side St. Louis City SC and the South African national team. .

Club career
Born in Dobsonville, Blom started his career at Kaizer Chiefs, and made his debut on 1 October 2019, starting against Lamontville Golden Arrows, before appearing again for the club on 27 October 2019 against Mamelodi Sundowns.

International career
Blom appeared for the South Africa national under-20 soccer team at the 2019 FIFA U-20 World Cup and the 2019 Africa U-20 Cup of Nations.

He made his debut for the South Africa national soccer team on 6 September 2021 in a World Cup qualifier against Ghana, a 1–0 home victory. He substituted Percy Tau in the 77th minute.

Career statistics

References

Living people
1999 births
Sportspeople from Soweto
South African soccer players
South Africa under-20 international soccer players
South Africa international soccer players
Association football defenders
Kaizer Chiefs F.C. players
South African Premier Division players
Soccer players from Gauteng